Dinesh Chandra Rupasinghe Gunawardena (born 2 March 1949) is a Sri Lankan politician serving as the Prime Minister of Sri Lanka since 22 July 2022. He also holds the positions of Minister of Public Administration, Home Affairs, Provincial Councils and Local Government. Gunawardena has been leader of the left-wing Mahajana Eksath Peramuna (MEP) party since 1983, and has taken cabinet positions under several previous governments, including Leader of the House from 2020 until 2022.

Born in a political family, the son of Philip Gunawardena and Kusumasiri Gunawardena, and nephew of Vivienne Goonewardene, he was educated at Royal College, Colombo and later at the University of Oregon, where he advocated pacifism in the Vietnam War. Entering politics in 1983 as a Member of Parliament from Maharagama and later Colombo, his first role in government was as Minister of Transport under Ratnasiri Wickremanayake.

In 2022, Gunawardena was appointed as the Prime Minister after former President Gotabaya Rajapaksa resigned amidst the ongoing economic crisis and Ranil Wickremesinghe was elected as his successor.

Early life and family
Gunawardena was born into the political Gunawardena family on 2 March 1949. His father, Philip Gunawardena, was known as "the Father of Sri Lankan socialism" and a key independence figure, and his mother, Kusumasiri Gunawardena, was a member of parliament. His aunt, Vivienne Goonewardene, was often considered the "foremost female figure in the Sri Lankan left".

Educated at Royal Primary School, Colombo and Royal College, Colombo, he went on to study at the Netherlands School of Business. He also graduated with a B.B.A. from the University of Oregon, and whilst in the United States, became involved in student activism, taking part in anti-Vietnam War protests.

Gunawardena later married Ramani Wathsala Kotelawela. They had one son, Yadamini, and one daughter, Sankapali. Ramani died of undiagnosed hepatitis in the mid-1980s.

Political career

1972–2000
After graduation from the University of Oregon, Gunawardena worked in New York City, but returned to Sri Lanka in 1972 after his father's death. He was appointed to the Mahajana Eksath Peramuna's (MEP) central committee in August 1973, and became general-secretary of the MEP in 1974.

Gunawardena was the MEP's candidate in Avissawella at the 1977 parliamentary election, but failed to get elected until he ran as the MEP's candidate in the Maharagama Electoral District at the 1983 by-election, winning and entering Parliament. During the 1989 parliamentary election, Gunawardena successfully ran as one of the MEP's candidates in the multi-member Colombo Electoral District. He was again one of the MEP's candidates in Colombo District at the 1994 parliamentary election, but the MEP failed to win any seats in Parliament.

2000–2010
On 27 August 2000, the MEP joined the People's Alliance (PA). Gunawardena contested the 2000 parliamentary election as one of the PA's candidates in Colombo District. He was elected and re-entered Parliament. 

Following the 2000 election, he was appointed Minister of Transport, and was given the additional portfolio of Environment in September 2001. He was re-elected at the 2001 parliamentary election. 

On 20 January 2004 the Sri Lanka Freedom Party (SLFP) and the Janatha Vimukthi Peramuna (JVP) formed the United People's Freedom Alliance (UPFA), which the MEP joined on 2 February 2004. Gunawardena contested the 2004 parliamentary election as one of the UPFA's candidates in Colombo District. He was elected and re-entered Parliament. He was appointed Minister of Urban Development and Water Supply and Deputy Minister of Education after the election. In January 2007 his cabinet portfolio was changed to Minister of Urban Development and Sacred Area Development but he lost his deputy ministerial position. He was appointed Chief Government Whip in June 2008.

2010–present
Gunawardena was re-elected in the 2010 parliamentary election, following which he was  appointed Minister of Water Supply. He lost his cabinet position following the 2015 presidential election, albeit being re-elected. In March 2017 he was suspended from parliamentary sittings for one week due to repeatedly disrupting proceedings.

On 22 July 2022, Gunawardena was appointed as Prime Minister after former President Gotabaya Rajapaksa resigned amidst the ongoing economic and political crises and Ranil Wickremesinghe was elected as his successor by Parliament. Gunawardena and Wickremesinghe were classmates during school days.

Electoral history

Notes

Further reading

References

Prime Ministers of Sri Lanka
Transport ministers of Sri Lanka
Urban development ministers of Sri Lanka
Environment ministers of Sri Lanka
Chief Government Whips (Sri Lanka)
Deputy ministers of Sri Lanka
Members of the 8th Parliament of Sri Lanka
Members of the 9th Parliament of Sri Lanka
Members of the 11th Parliament of Sri Lanka
Members of the 12th Parliament of Sri Lanka
Members of the 13th Parliament of Sri Lanka
Members of the 14th Parliament of Sri Lanka
Members of the 15th Parliament of Sri Lanka
Members of the 16th Parliament of Sri Lanka
1949 births
Living people
Sinhalese politicians
Sinhalese trade unionists
Sri Lankan Buddhists
Mahajana Eksath Peramuna politicians
United People's Freedom Alliance politicians
Sri Lanka Podujana Peramuna politicians
University of Oregon alumni
Nyenrode Business University alumni
Alumni of Royal College, Colombo
Alumni of Royal Preparatory School